Bromodomain and WD repeat-containing protein 1 (BRWD1) also known as WD repeat-containing protein 9 (WDR9) is a protein that in humans is encoded by the BRWD1 gene.

Function 

This gene encodes a member of the WD repeat protein family. WD repeats are minimally conserved regions of approximately 40 amino acids typically bracketed by Gly-His and Trp-Asp (GH-WD), which may facilitate formation of heterotrimeric or multiprotein complexes. Members of this family are involved in a variety of cellular processes, including cell cycle progression, signal transduction, apoptosis, and gene regulation. This protein contains 2 bromodomains and 8 WD repeats, and the function of this protein is not known. This gene is located within the Down syndrome region-2 on chromosome 21. Alternative splicing of this gene generates 3 transcript variants diverging at the 3' ends.

See also 
 BRWD3
 WDR11, also known as BRWD2

References

External links

Further reading